Exitivm is the ninth studio album by Dutch death metal band Pestilence. It was released on 25 June 2021, after having been signed to Agonia Records. Because Septimiu Hărşan had to leave the band due to restrictions caused by the COVID-19 pandemic, he was replaced by Michiel van der Plicht (God Dethroned and Carach Angren) who has since become a full-time member. It is also the band's first album with bassist Joost van der Graaf and guitarist Rutger van Noordenburg.

Track listing

Personnel
 Patrick Mameli – guitars, vocals
 Rutger van Noordenburg – guitars
 Joost van der Graaf – bass guitar
 Michiel van der Plicht – drums

Charts

References

2021 albums
Pestilence (band) albums